St Aloysius, or Aloysius Gonzaga, is a 16th-century Italian Jesuit seminarian and saint.

St Aloysius may also refer to:

St. Aloysius Catholic Church (disambiguation)
St Aloysius Church (disambiguation)
St Aloysius' College (disambiguation)
St Aloysius school (disambiguation)